Miranda Rae (born in the United Kingdom) is a British radio DJ, best known for her pioneering show on Galaxy Radio & Radio 5, Ujima Radio, and Soul Train Radio. She was the first full-time female radio presenter on UK radio.

Radio career
At 18 years old, Rae became Promotions and PR manager for FTP Radio in Bristol. FTP Radio the UK's first pirate to station to win a legal license became Galaxy Radio. She was one of the few people to remain from FTP. Miranda was not only the first full-time female DJ in the country she was the first full-time radio dance DJ in UK pioneering new music in the UK.

Galaxy Radio soon recognized her national appeal and she became part of their prime time, regional mainstream presenters, and used to be on air 6 days a week. Rae has also established a worldwide reputation for pioneering new music and her A 'n' R work was recognized officially by many DJ's, artists and records companies.

She has been responsible for discovering many new artists, including Roni Size, now one of the world's leading music producers and winner of The Mercury Music Prize. She has also worked with and interviewed DJ's/artists that include:- Take That, East 17, Portishead, Shaggy, Massive Attack, Tricky. Miranda also manages Onallee who co wrote the Mercury Prize Winning Album New Forms.

Later she was approached by BBC Radio 5 and asked to present and write for a weekly speech based programme called Euromix. Miranda took over the role as presenter from Magenta Devine (Rapido) and worked alongside Robert Elms (Travel Log, Channel 4, Spandau Ballet, Johnny Vaughan, Normski, Danny Ball as well as comedians Lee Hurst, Kevin Day and Nick Wilty.

When presenting BBC Radio 5's Euromix show, she won her the Sony Radio Award for best youth programme.

Since the birth of her son in January 2007, Rae has happily settled in the UK.

The Word radio show
The Word is a weekly radio show that Rae presents on Ujima Radio. Which features pioneering new music, human interest stories, and interviews local and international personalities who have a story to tell. Rae says of her radio show on Ujima, that "The atmosphere is electric with the buzz that only live radio can create, and there is no other station in the world that would let me have a completely  to produce the radio that I like."

References

External links
Miranda Rae's website
Soul Train Radio
Ujima Radio
BBC Radio 4

Living people
BBC Radio 4 presenters
English radio DJs
Year of birth missing (living people)